Camion is a 2012 Canadian drama film directed by Rafaël Ouellet. The film centres on a truck driver who is suffering from severe depression after a woman kills herself by crashing her car into his truck; although he was not at fault, the incident has left him suicidal, resulting in the mending of his strained relationships with his sons Sam and Alain (Stéphane Breton) after he reaches out to them for help.

Cast
 Julien Poulin as Germain
  as Samuel
 Maude Giguère as Manu
 Jacob Tierney as Jacob
 Stéphane Breton as Alain
  as Rebecca
 Cindy Sampson as Jade

Release
The film was first released at the 47th Karlovy Vary International Film Festival, where it was nominated for the Crystal Globe, won the Award of the Ecumenical Jury and the Best Director Award for Ouellet.

Awards
The film received eight Jutra Award nominations at the 15th Jutra Awards in 2013, winning two.

References

External links
 

2012 films
2012 drama films
Canadian drama films
Films directed by Rafaël Ouellet
French-language Canadian films
2010s Canadian films